Welcombe is a village and civil parish on the coast of north Devon, England, just north of the border with Cornwall. It is part of the district of Torridge. The population taken at the 2011 census was 187.

It is accessible via the A39 and has a beach called Welcombe Mouth, which is a challenge to get to. Its parish church, Welcombe Parish Church, is one of only four ancient dedications to Saint Nectan. Welcombe comprises several smaller communities including Welcombe Cross, Darracot, Upcott and Mead. There is a local pottery, pub, The Old Smithy Inn and village stores. There are two small campsites in the area and the South West Coast Path offers views to Lundy.

See also
North Devon Coast AONB

References

External links

 North Devon Coast Areas of Outstanding Natural Beauty
 Village Website
 Welcombe Parish Church

Villages in Devon
Beaches of Devon
Torridge District